Augusto Castro Herrera (born 19 December 1986) is a retired Colombian professional BMX cyclist. He represented his nation Colombia at the 2008 Summer Olympics, and has claimed multiple Colombian national titles in the men's elite category and a prestigious gold medal in junior cruiser at the 2004 UCI BMX World Championships in Valkenswaard, Netherlands. Before announcing his retirement in August 2013, Castro also raced and trained professionally for Psykopath Industries BMX Team.

Castro qualified for the Colombian squad, along with Andrés Jiménez Caicedo and Sergio Salazar, in men's BMX cycling at the 2008 Summer Olympics in Beijing by receiving one of the nation's three available berths from the Union Cycliste Internationale based on his top-ten performance in the BMX World Rankings. Castro started his morning session by grabbing the seventh prelims seed in 36.301 seconds, but he could not match a more stellar ride in his quarterfinal heat with 14 positioning points and a fifth-place finish, narrowly missing out the semifinals by a single mark.

References

External links
 
 
 
 

1986 births
Living people
Colombian male cyclists
BMX riders
Olympic cyclists of Colombia
Cyclists at the 2008 Summer Olympics
South American Games gold medalists for Colombia
South American Games medalists in cycling
Competitors at the 2010 South American Games
Sportspeople from Medellín
20th-century Colombian people
21st-century Colombian people
Competitors at the 2010 Central American and Caribbean Games